Arxellia tracheia is a species of sea snail, a marine gastropod mollusk, in the family Solariellidae.

References

Solariellidae